Bisschop is a Dutch surname meaning "bishop".  It may refer to:

 Abraham Bisschop (1670–1729), Dutch still life and bird painter, son of Cornelis
Christoffel Bisschop (1828–1904), Dutch genre painter and lithographer, husband of Kate
 Cornelis Bisschop (1630-1674), Dutch genre painter
 Hilligje Bisschop (born 1948), Dutch Christian feminist
 Jacobus Bisschop (1658-1697), Dutch painter, son of Cornelis
 Kate Bisschop-Swift (1834-1928), English-born Dutch painter, wife of Christoffel
 Richard Bisschop (1849–1926), painter, graphic artist and watercolorist, husband of Suze
 Roelof Bisschop (born 1956), Dutch historian and politician
 Simon Bisschop (1583–1643), Dutch theologian and Remonstrant
 Suze Bisschop-Robertson (1855–1922), Dutch Impressionist painter, wife of Richard
 Walter Steins Bisschop (1810–1881), Dutch Jesuit priest, Vicar Apostolic of Bombay 1860–1867

See also 
 De Bisschop
 Bischof
 Bishop (surname)

References

Dutch-language surnames